Indian plum is a common name for several plants and may refer to:

Oemleria, a shrub in the rose family native to the Pacific Coast of North America
 Flacourtia indica, an Asian species often used as a living fence
 Flacourtia jangomas, a rainforest tree in the willow family that is widely planted in Asia and Southeast Asia
 Flacourtia rukam, an Asian species
 Ziziphus mauritiana, Indian ber or chinese date